Lankhor was a French video game company, notable for producing Mortville Manor, the first video game to feature speech synthesis during gameplay.

Lankhor was created as a result of the fusion of Kyil khor Creation and Béatrice & Jean-Luc Langlois in 1987, and was closed in December 2001 due to a difficult financial situation which started at the end of 2000.

List of games produced by Lankhor

 1987 Mortville Manor
 1987 No (Never Outside!)
 1987 Wanderer
 1988 Elemental
 1988 G.Nius
 1988 Killdozers
 1988 Rody & Mastico
 1988 Troubadours
 1990 Maupiti Island
 1990 Raiders
 1990 Saga
 1990 Sdaw
 1990 La Secte Noire
 1991 Alive
 1991 Alcantor
 1991 Burglar
 1991 Fugitif
 1991 Infernal House
 1991 La Crypte Des Maudits
 1991 La Malédiction
 1991 Le Trésor D'Ali Gator
 1991 Mokowe
 1991 Outzone
 1991 Vroom
 1992 Silva
 1992 Survivre
 1992 Vroom Data Disk
 1993 Black Sect
 1993 Vroom Multiplayer
 1993 F1
 1994 F1 World Championship Edition
 1995 Kawasaki Superbike
 1998 New Order Liberation
 1999 Official Formula 1 Racing
 2000 F1 World Grand Prix
 2000 Warm Up!
 2002 Ski Park Manager
 2003

External links
  lankhor.net : unofficial tribute site

Defunct video game companies of France
Video game companies established in 1987
Video game companies disestablished in 2001
Video game development companies
Video game publishers